The Cahaba pebblesnail, scientific name Clappia cahabensis, is a species of very small freshwater snail, aquatic gastropod mollusks in the family Lithoglyphidae.

This species is named after the Cahaba River. This species is endemic to the United States.

This species was listed as extinct in the 2006 and 2010 IUCN Red List. It was thought to be extinct because of water pollution coming from modern surface mining of coal in the USA.

Until recently the Cahaba pebblesnail was believed to be extinct, one of 34 snail species fallen victim to dams built along the Coosa River between 1917 and 1967. In 2004 however, biologists discovered the snail living less than fifty miles to the west, in Alabama's Cahaba River, which parallels the Coosa.

Description 
Clappia cahabensis has been described by American malacologist William J. Clench in 1965. Clench's type description reads as follows:

Ecology 
Its natural habitat is rivers. Clappia cahabensis requires rapid flowing sections of river shoals.

References
This article incorporates public domain text from the reference

External links 
 Species profile of Cahaba pebblesnail (Clappia cahabensis) at U.S. Fish & Wildlife Service webpage

Lithoglyphidae
Freshwater animals of North America
Molluscs of the United States
Endemic fauna of the United States
Taxa named by William J. Clench
Gastropods described in 1965
Taxonomy articles created by Polbot